Ablabesmyia miki is a species of fly described by Maurice Emile Marie Goetghebuer in 1936. No sub-species specified in Catalogue of Life.

References

Tanypodinae
Insects described in 1936